Lu Wei-luan (born 1939), better known by her pen name Xiaosi, is a Hong Kong essayist, educator, and scholar. She also writes under the pseudonyms of Mingchuan (明川) and Lufan (盧颿). Her major publications include Talk on the Way《路上談》(1979),  Moving in Daylight Shadows《日影行》(1982), and Notes from Discipleship 《承教小記》(1982). Lu has been an eminent researcher of Hong Kong literature for decades and holds an honorary position at the Hong Kong Literature Research Centre of the Chinese University of Hong Kong. She was also invited to be the columnist of two Hong Kong newspapers, the Sing Tao Daily and  the Ming Pao.

Life 
Lu was born in Hong Kong in 1939, of Panyu, Guangdong ancestry. She graduated with a degree in Chinese at the New Asia College of The Chinese University of Hong Kong in 1964. She received her Diploma of Education from the Northcote College of Education in 1965 and began her career in education with a teaching position in secondary school. She later received an MPhil degree in the University of Hong Kong (HKU) in 1981.

As inspired by her teacher Tang Junyi, Lu went to Japan to further pursue her study on contemporary Chinese Literature and worked as a Research Fellow at the Institute for Research in Humanities of Kyoto University in 1973. She continued her career in education as a lecturer in the Chinese Department at HKU in 1978 when she returned from Japan. She later worked in the Department of Chinese Language and Literature at CUHK in 1979, became a professor in 1992, and retired in 2002.

Academic Achievements 
After her retirement in 2002, Lu continued contributing to Hong Kong Literature and became the Honorary Director of the Hong Kong Literature Research Centre in CUHK. In 2008, she worked as both the Adjunct Professor at the Centre for East Asian Studies and the Advisor in the Hong Kong Literature Research Centre in the university.

To cite her devotion and contribution in education, Lu was awarded with the Vice-Chancellor's Exemplary Teaching Award by CUHK in 2000, the Outstanding Educator Award by the Hong Kong Institute of Education in 2003, and the Award for Outstanding Contribution in Arts from the Hong Kong Arts Development Council in 2010.

Family Background 
Lu is the second child of her parent and has an elder brother. Under the teaching from her mother, she was already in touch with the traditional Chinese culture before her education in formal primary school for years. Her mother taught and read her various Chinese classics, such as Water Margin and Three Character Classic, every day. On the other hand, Lu's father focused more on exploring the nature. He always brought her to hiking and encouraged her to closely observe the lives in nature. However, her parent were both deceased when she was in primary school. The short, yet profound teaching from her parent had built up her interest in Chinese literature and greatly influenced her writings.

Life as an Educationist

Inspiration from Tang Junyi 

Tang Jun-yi was not only the teacher of Lu in New Asia College, but also a mentor in supporting and inspiring her. In Lu's early time, she lost both her parent and her brother. She was alone, mentally unstable, and even isolated herself from others for four years. Mr. Mo Ke-fei, Lu's teacher in secondary school, introduced her to read Tang's The Sequel of Experience of Life《人生之體驗》. This book gave her a new lease of life and pulled her out from the depression. She was inspired by the writing of Mr. Tang and determined to study in New Asia College. She later received education in New Asia College and became Mr. Tang's student. After graduation, she started her teaching career in a secondary school. In 1971, Lu failed to lead some of her students back from sidetrack. She lost her faith in teaching and suffered from depression. Mr. Tang, therefore, suggested her to take a break from teaching, review and evaluation herself. It led to her decision of studying in Japan in 1973, which became a turning point in her life.

Tang's teaching motto and his New Confucianism have greatly influenced Lu's teaching and writings. As referring to Mr. Tang, teaching a student is similar to "carrying a student to walk near the edge of a cliff". A teacher should be especially careful when teaching and notice any possible danger. This idea was deep-rooted in Lu's mind and inspired her to devote her life in passes the knowledge and spirit to next generation. It is, at the same time, important for her students to honor the teachers and respects their teaching. On the other hand, the idea of New Confucianism could also be found in many of her writings. She reminds people not to blindly follow the traditions. Instead, people should learn to find the balance between conformity to social norms and rebellion against inequality.

Inspiration in Japan 

In 1973, Lu went to Japan to further pursue her study on contemporary Chinese Literature at the Institute for Research in Humanities of Kyoto University. She admired the Japanese culture, in which the study and development of humanities and literature are highly respected. During her study in Japan, she was amazed by the teaching methods in Japan, which teaching is not limited only in classroom but also through traveling. It was also remarkable that most of the published literature and newspapers are carefully preserved in universities’ libraries. This inspired her to later found the Hong Kong Literature Research Centre and establish the Hong Kong Literature Collection in CUHK.

Her study in Japan also helped her to review her life in Hong Kong in a different perspective and brought her a strong sense of nostalgia. The students in Japan reminded her of her students and her life as a teacher in Hong Kong. It fostered her to regain her will in teaching and develop a clearer goal and path to preserve and pass the knowledge and spirits in Hong Kong.

Themes of Writing

Gratitude to Teacher 
The inspirations from Mr. Tang have greatly influenced Lu and made her an enthusiastic teacher in passing his spirits. Many of her writings have addressed her gratitude towards the teaching and support from Mr. Tang. In Memorial to My Teacher《告吾師在天之靈》, the guidance from Mr. Tang is significant in leading her to the right and clear path in her life. He has pulled her out from the anguish and perplexities in the past. It reveals the Chinese traditional teacher-student relationship and the respectful attitude of students towards their teachers. It is important to honor the teachers and pass their teachings to the next generation.

Patriotism 
Albeit her admirations towards Japanese culture, she especially opposed the idea of militarism in Japan. Many of her writings have revealed the anti-war and patriotic feelings. In Thoughts in Kyoto《京都雜想》, the monument in celebrating the end of Sino-Japanese War in Japan is used as a symbol and sarcasm to Militarism in Japan. She reminds people not to forget the history. However, despite the great sorrow and sadness brought by Japanese invasion, people should, at the same time, learn to let go of the negative emotion in order to move forwards. In Forgiveness《不記恨》, although the sorrow in Sino-Japanese War is addressed, she urges people not to trap in the past. Forgiveness is crucial to lead people to a better future.

Nostalgia 
Lu has witnessed the gradual transformation of Hong Kong from an industrial-oriented city to an international financial center. Under modernization, the rent of local shops surges from year to year, which small local business could hardly survive. Business in Hong Kong has entered a stage of homogenization. The lost of local colors has brought out the nostalgia feelings within Lu. Many of her writings have demonstrated her nostalgia towards the old Hong Kong. As shown in her writing 《懷舊十題》, nostalgia is not a trend but a significant feeling in revealing the deepest-emotion of a person. It represents part of our lives and becomes the eternal memory in our brain. In the Life of Teaching《一生承教》, Lu points out people's negligence of Hong Kong local colors and reminds people not to treasure thing only when they have lost it. Instead, we should treasure things which are still exist.

Style of Writing

Metaphors 
As influenced by Lu's father in exploring the nature, she always uses metaphors in relating the nature of different insects to humanities. Take Cicada《蟬》as an example, by describing the special characteristics and nature of cicada, Lu points out the core value of a teacher. To her, the life of a cicada is similar to the life of a teacher. Teachers are crucial in passing the knowledge to the next generation. No matter how long it takes, they should live properly to pass these spirits.

On the other hand, metaphors were also used to introduce Mr. Tang's idea of New Confucianism. Take Moth《蛾》 and Snail《蝸牛》as examples, Lu took them as metaphors to people nowadays. In Moth《蛾》, moths' nature of flying to flame is regarded as a fatal attraction. They are attracted to light, which repeatedly leads to their death caused by fire.  Similarly, in Snail《蝸牛》, snails use only their feelers to move forward and refuse to leave the road. This stubborn attitude and nature lead to the death of the snails, which they are repeatedly mashed by humans or cars. These natures of moths and snails are similar to people nowadays, which they blindly follow the social conventions and repeat making the same mistake in the past. Through the use of metaphor, Lu urges people to change and critically examine the rationality of these practices.

Publications 
Lu has published a total of 21 books and stopped writing in 2014. The books are as follow:

References

External links 
 盧瑋鑾 小思老師
 自強不息 小思傑出教育家
 第六集：四人行：小思、古蒼梧、陸離、石琪(上)：個性篇
 第七集：四人行：小思、古蒼梧、陸離、石琪(下)：承傳篇

1939 births
Living people
Hong Kong women writers